State Highway 27 (SH 27) is a State Highway in Kerala, India that starts in Palakkad Collectorate and ends at the state boundary. The highway is 35.0 km long.

The Route Map 
Palakkad Collectorate(NH 17) - Kannady - Koduvayur - Tattamangalam - Mettupalayam junction, Tattamangalam - Ayyappankavu temple - Nanniyode - Meenakshipuram - Gopalapuram - Meenakshipuram road joins - Kerala State boundary - Road continues to Pollachi in Tamil Nadu.

See also 
Roads in Kerala
List of State Highways in Kerala

References 

State Highways in Kerala
Roads in Palakkad district